Praedora leucophaea is a moth of the family Sphingidae. It is known from dry bush areas from northern South Africa to Kenya.

The length of the forewings is 20–21 mm. The body and forewings are greyish white with light brown transverse bands. The hindwings are uniform very pale grey.

References

Sphingini
Moths described in 1903
Moths of Africa